Gmina Łukowa is a rural gmina (administrative district) in Biłgoraj County, Lublin Voivodeship, in eastern Poland.

The gmina contains part of the protected area called Puszcza Solska Landscape Park.

Villages
Gmina Łukowa contains the villages and settlements of Borowiec, Chmielek, Kozaki Osuchowskie, Łukowa, Osuchy, Pisklaki, Podsośnina Łukowska, Szarajówka and Szostaki.

Neighbouring gminas
Gmina Łukowa is bordered by the gminas of Aleksandrów, Józefów, Księżpol, Obsza, Susiec and Tarnogród.

References
Polish official population figures 2006

Lukowa
Biłgoraj County